The  is a wooden staff carried by yamabushi and pilgrims on the Shikoku Pilgrimage in Japan. The kongō-zue is said to represent the body of Kūkai and to support the pilgrim along the way; as such it is treated with respect, having its "feet" washed and being brought inside at the end of each day's journey. It is inscribed with the chant Namu-Daishi-Henjō-Kongō and Dōgyō-Ninin or "We two pilgrims together". By another tradition it is carried aloft when crossing a bridge so that it does not touch the ground and wake Kōbō Daishi. Pilgrims leave their kongō-zue at Ōkubo-ji, the final temple, upon completion of the circuit. There is an occasional funerary practice in Shikoku and other parts of Japan whereby the decedent is dressed as a pilgrim and placed in the casket along with a staff and pilgrim's stamp book (nōkyōchō) for their final journey.

See also
Oizuru (garment) is one of the sacred garments of the traditional dress of Japanese pilgrims.

References

Buddhist pilgrimage sites in Japan
Walking